The Piedmont Regional Library System (PRLS) is a consortium of ten public libraries serving the counties of Banks, Barrow, and Jackson, Georgia, United States.

PRLS is a member of PINES, a program of the Georgia Public Library Service that covers 53 library systems in 143 counties of Georgia. Any resident in a PINES supported library system has access to over 10.6 million books in the system's circulation. The library is also serviced by GALILEO, a program of the University System of Georgia which stands for "GeorgiA LIbrary LEarning Online". This program offers residents in supported libraries access to over 100 databases indexing thousands of periodicals and scholarly journals. It also boasts over 10,000 journal titles in full text.

Branches

Library systems in neighboring counties
Northeast Georgia Regional Library System to the north
Athens Regional Library System to the east
Azalea Regional Library System to the south
Gwinnett County Public Library to the southwest
Hall County Library System to the west

References

External links
PINES catalog

County library systems in Georgia (U.S. state)
Public libraries in Georgia (U.S. state)